Aphroceras is a genus of calcareous sponges belonging to the family Grantiidae.

References

Calcaronea